Gąsiory may refer to the following places:
Gąsiory, Greater Poland Voivodeship (west-central Poland)
Gąsiory, Lublin Voivodeship (east Poland)
Gąsiory, Masovian Voivodeship (east-central Poland)